Xeropicta krynickii is a terrestrial species of gastropods belonging to the family Geomitridae.

Distribution

The species is found in Western Asia. and around the Black Sea.

References

 Krynicki, J. A. (1833). Novae species aut minus cognitae e Chondri, Bulimi, Peristomae Helicisque generibus praecipue Rossiae meridionalis. Bulletin de la Société Impériale des Naturalistes de Moscou. 6: 391-436, pl. 6-10. Moskva.
 Boettger, O. (1883). Malakozoologische Mittheilungen. II. Binnenconchylien aus Syrien. Bericht über die Thätigkeit des Offenbacher Vereins für Naturkunde, 22/23: 162-176, pl. 1. Offenbach am Main.
 Avnimelech, M. (1933). Studien über Landschnecken Palästinas. Archiv für Molluskenkunde, 65 (2): 49-70, pl. 9-10. Frankfurt am Main 
 Pallary, P. (1939). Deuxième addition à la faune malacologique de la Syrie. Mémoires présentés a l'Institut d'Égypte, 39: 1-141, pl. 1-7. Le Caire.
 Bank, R. A.; Neubert, E. (2017). Checklist of the land and freshwater Gastropoda of Europe. Last update: July 16th, 2017
 Gittenberger, E. (1991). On Cyprian Helicellinae (Mollusca: Gastropoda Pulmonata: Helicidae), making a new start. Zoologische Mededelingen, 65 (7): 99-128. Leiden
 Sysoev, A. V. & Schileyko, A. A. (2009). Land snails and slugs of Russia and adjacent countries. Sofia/Moskva (Pensoft). 312 pp., 142 plates.
 Neubert, E. (1998). Annotated checklist of the terrestrial and freshwater molluscs of the Arabian Peninsula with descriptions of new species. Fauna of Arabia. 17: 333-461.

External links
 Pfeiffer, L. (1841). Symbolae ad historiam Heliceorum. Sectio prima (vol. 1). Kassel: Th. Fischer. 88 pp
 Mousson, A. (1861). Coquilles terrestres et fluviatiles recueillies par M. le Prof. J.R. Roth dans son dernier voyage en Orient. Vierteljahrsschrift der Naturforschenden Gesellschaft in Zürich, 6 (1): 1-34; 6 (2): 124-156. Zürich.
 Westerlund, C. A. (1889). Fauna der in der paläarctischen Region (Europa, Kaukasien, Sibirien, Turan, Persien, Kurdistan, Armenien, Mesopotamien, Kleinasien, Syrien, Arabien, Egypten, Tripolis, Tunesien, Algerien und Marocco) lebenden Binnenconchylien. II. Gen. Helix. Berlin: R. Friedländer. pp. 473 + 31 (Register).
 Germain, L. (1921-1922). Mollusques terrestres et fluviatiles de Syrie. In: Voyage zoologique d'Henri Gadeau de Kerville en Syrie (avril-juin 1908). Tome 1 (1921): Introduction et Gastéropodes, 1-523. Tome 2 (1922): Pélécypodes, index et 23 planches, 1-242. Paris: Baillière
 Pfeiffer, L. (1847). Diagnosen neuer Heliceen. Zeitschrift für Malakozoologie. Cassel. 4 (1): 12-16
  Gojšina, V., Páll-Gergely, B., Vujić, M. & Dedov, I. (2022). First record of the genus Xeropicta Monterosato, 1892 (Gastropoda: Eupulmonata: Geomitridae) in Serbia. Folia Malacologica. 1(30): 47–53
 Neubert, E.; Amr, Z. S.; Waitzbauer, W.; Al Talafha, H. (2015). Annotated checklist of the terrestrial gastropods of Jordan (Mollusca: Gastropoda). Archiv für Molluskenkunde. 144(2): 169-238.

Geomitridae